"Roger" Charles Horace Lamley (9 March 1870 – 22 December 1961) was an Australian rules footballer who played with Fitzroy in the Victorian Football League (VFL). He played for North Melbourne and Collingwood in the Victorian Football Association before coming to Fitzroy.

Notes

References
Holmesby, Russell & Main, Jim (2009). The Encyclopedia of AFL Footballers. 8th ed. Melbourne: Bas Publishing.

External links

1870 births
1961 deaths
Australian rules footballers from Victoria (Australia)
Australian Rules footballers: place kick exponents
North Melbourne Football Club (VFA) players
Collingwood Football Club (VFA) players
Fitzroy Football Club players